New Hope Railroad 40 is a 2-8-0 "Consolidation" type steam locomotive built in 1925 by the Baldwin Locomotive Works for the Lancaster and Chester Railroad (L&C) in Lancaster, South Carolina. No. 40 is the only operating steam locomotive on the New Hope Railroad in New Hope, Pennsylvania.

History

Lancaster & Chester Railroad
No. 40 was ordered by the Lancaster and Chester Railroad of Lancaster, South Carolina from the Baldwin Locomotive Works for the price of $25,125.96. The locomotive was completed on December 2, 1925. The locomotive was constructed at the Broad Street erecting hall of the Baldwin Locomotive Works in nearby Philadelphia, Pennsylvania, with final assembly happening at the Eddystone Plant. No. 40 was one of the final steam locomotives constructed at the Broad Street site. On December 3, the locomotive was brought by the Baltimore & Ohio Railroad from Philadelphia to Washington, D.C., where it was received by the Southern Railway who hauled it to the L&C's interchange in Catawba, South Carolina. The locomotive arrived at L&C on December 5. Being one of the railroad's largest engines, it was immediately put on the main train from Lancaster to Catawba.

Only 10 days after the locomotive's arrival, on December 15, No. 40 was involved in a wreck near Pleasant Hill, South Carolina, killing the locomotive's fireman and critically injuring the engineer. The wreck was determined to be the fault of the engineer, who refused to apply the train's air brakes, who preferred only using the locomotive's independent brakes. The pressure locked the drivers at 45mph, causing the No. 3 driver tire on the fireman's side to pop off and derail the locomotive. Little is known about this wreck as no photos of the wreck have been surfaced, but it is reported that the wreck destroyed approximately 500' of L&C's mainline. This wreck also destroyed No. 40’s original wooden pilot. The wreck resulted in the railroad not being able to haul product for 3 months. The Lancaster and Chester sued Baldwin Locomotive Works, resulting in an undisclosed settlement that in turn paid for the purchase of Lancaster & Chester No. 41 from the American Locomotive Company. No. 40 was repaired and rebuilt by the railroad and re-entered service in Spring 1926. After the wreck, No. 40 was designated as a switcher for the various yards across the railroad.

Cliffside Railroad
In 1947, after L&C dieselized their entire roster, No. 40 was sold to the Cliffside Railroad, a short line in North Carolina. During its entire tenure on the Cliffside, the relatively diminutive 80-ton 2-8-0 was the largest locomotive the railroad owned. However, the locomotive was not used much as it was often overpowered for the small switching jobs and sharp track.

New Hope Railroad

In 1962, the Cliffside Railroad sold the 40 to Steam Trains Inc., located in New Hope, Pennsylvania. No. 40 was the first piece of equipment purchased by the group, in hoping to find a branch line to run it on. No. 40 was initially moved to Reading Company's yard in Wilmington, Delaware, before being moved to the Reading Company shops in St. Clair, Pennsylvania with the rest of Steam Trains Inc.'s equipment. In 1966, Steam Trains Inc. was reorganized as the New Hope Railroad and moved all of its equipment, including 40, to the former Reading Company yard in New Hope, Pennsylvania.

Even though 40 was operational at the time, it only saw limited service in the summer of 1967 as stablemate 1533 was reportedly easier to run and fire and was more popular with engine crews. The locomotive also reportedly swayed from side to side even on straight track. This was would later be discovered due to an improper repair by the L&C of the third driver (and also a potential reason why Cliffside did not use the locomotive often). This would be corrected upon in the 1975 rebuild. From 1974-1975, 40 was rebuilt by the New Hope & Ivyland's new owners, the McHugh Brothers and returned to service and operated alongside the railroads third engine former Us Army 0-6-0 No. 9.  

In the late 1970s in addition to 40 being taken out of service for repairs, the New Hope and Ivyland's passenger operations were handed over to the newly formed New Hope Steam Railway. From 1981 to 1986, No. 40 shared excursion responsibilities with No. 9 during the late 1970s and early 1980s, and would operate both on and off home rails. One of its offline adventures took place in 1985 when it ventured down to the Fairless Works of U.S. Steel in nearby Morrisville, Pennsylvania. This journey was part of a weekend-long open house for plant employees and their families. No. 40 pulled the majority of their trains until the group's leadership changed in late 1986.

In 1990, the New Hope and Ivyland Railroad, now New Hope Railroad, came under new ownership and 40 was rebuilt to operational condition by shop forces from the Strasburg Rail Road, returning to operation in June 1991. 

On May 18, 2019, No. 40 powered four excursions over the SEPTA Lansdale/Doylestown Line in Montgomery County between North Wales and Gwynedd Valley, Pennsylvania as part of North Wales Borough's Sesquicentennial celebrations. This would be the locomotive's first trip on the mainline since 1985.

See also 
 Southern Railway 385
 Great Western 60
 Great Western 90
 Valley Railroad 40
 Arcade & Attica 18
 Canadian National 89
 Canadian National 7470
 Lake Superior and Ishpeming 23
 Lake Superior and Ishpeming 18
 Reading Blue Mountain and Northern Railroad 425

References 

2-8-0 locomotives
Individual locomotives of the United States
Baldwin locomotives
Railway locomotives introduced in 1925
Standard gauge locomotives of the United States
Preserved steam locomotives of Pennsylvania